Indonesia Fashion Week or IFW is the biggest fashion week in Indonesia that being held annually since 2011 at the Jakarta Convention Center in Jakarta. The event is arranged by Indonesian Fashion Entrepreneurs and Designers Association (APPMI), reflecting and promoting Indonesian culture in fashion. Fashion shows from different designers and fairs are arranged on the occasion.

See also

Fashion week
List of fashion events

References 

Fashion events in Indonesia
Annual events in Indonesia
Fashion weeks
Fashion industry
2011 establishments in Indonesia
Recurring events established in 2011